Königsberg in Bayern is a town in the Haßberge district, in Lower Franconia, Bavaria, Germany. It is situated 7 km (5 miles) northeast of Haßfurt, and 31 km (20 miles) northwest of Bamberg.

It was an exclave of Saxe-Coburg and Gotha until 1918, after having been a part of Saxe-Hildburghausen.

Notable people

Johannes Müller alias Regiomontanus (1436-1476), a famous mathematician and astronomer
Johannes Marcellus (1510-1552), a philologist and poet, also called Regiomontanus
Friedrich Heinrich von Seckendorff (1673–1763), Imperial Fieldmarschall and diplomat
Wolfgang Carl Briegel (1626–1712) a German organist, teacher, and composer.

References

Haßberge (district)
Saxe-Coburg and Gotha